Page Park may refer to:

 Page Park, Bristol
 Page Park, Florida